Hope is a small village and community in Flintshire, north-east Wales. The village is located approximately 3 miles / 4.5 km from the Wales-England border, on the course of the River Alyn, and less than 5 miles from Wrexham.

Hope is one of several villages including Caergwrle, Abermorddu and Cefn-y-bedd which together form the community. At the 2001 Census, community the population was 2,522, increasing to 4,224 at the 2011 Census partly due to boundary changes. One of the major features in the area is Hope Mountain (Mynydd yr Hob), to the west of the village.

History
Yr Hob was originally the name of a commote within the cantref of Maelor in the medieval Kingdom of Powys. Both the Welsh and English language names are derived from an Old English word hop meaning "enclosed land in a marsh", a relic of Mercian settlement in the area.

In 1086, when the Domesday Book was compiled, Hope was listed as a very small settlement and it was within the hundred of Exestan and the county of Cheshire.

The old parish of Hope was once divided into two parts by the River Alyn. One part, called Hope Medachied, was made up of the townships of Uwchmynydd, Cymau, Caergwrle and Rhanberfedd: the other was made of Hope Owen, Estyn and Shordley. In 1843 a large area of Hope Medachied was transferred to the new parish of Llanfynydd.

The village's long association with neighbouring Caergwrle has given rise to the local expression "Live in Hope, die in Caergwrle".

Facilities
In 2007, the secondary school Castell Alun High, which is located in the village, became the only school in North Wales to be awarded 7 Grade 1s by Estyn, the school inspection service for Wales. The judgement makes Castell Alun one of the top schools in Wales.

Hope has good transport links with local towns and cities, notably Wrexham, Chester and Mold, with the Borderlands Line running directly through Hope railway station giving access to Liverpool via the Wirral Peninsula.

Hope has a library, a sports centre and football, cricket and rugby union clubs. The Castell Alun Colts Football Club play in the Welsh Football League system and are affiliated to the Football Association of Wales and the North East Wales Football Association. At present (2018/19 season) they play in the Welsh National League (Wrexham Area) Division One, the fourth level on the Welsh Football League pyramid
.

In 2017, work began on a community project to build a replica of a Roman Fort in a disused quarry in the village. The project known as "Park in the Past" is set to become a centre for education and leisure activities

Governance
An electoral ward in the same name exists, which covers the village of Hope and elects one county councillor to Flintshire County Council. This ward had a population of 2,605 at the 2011 census.

See also
 Hope Hall

References

External links 

Photos of Hope and surrounding area on geograph.org.uk

Communities in Flintshire
Villages in Flintshire
Wards of Flintshire
Commotes